CMC Electronics Inc. is a Canadian avionics manufacturer. The company's main manufacturing facility is located in Montreal, Quebec with additional facilities located in Ottawa, Ontario and Sugar Grove, Illinois.

History 

The company was founded in 1903 as Canadian Wireless Telegraph Company of Canada by Guglielmo Marconi. In 1925, the company was renamed Canadian Marconi Company. In 1948, English Electric purchased the UK based Marconi Company and in 1953 acquired 50.6% of Canadian Marconi Company.

In 1968 English Electric was itself purchased by General Electric Company (GEC), which took control of the 50.6% share of CMC.
 
On November 30, 1999 British Aerospace completed its purchase of GEC's Canadian Electronic Systems to form BAE Systems. In December 1999, BAE Systems purchased GEC's 51.6% share of CMC in a separate transaction. In February 2000 the company changed its name to BAE Systems Canada. In April 2001, ONCAP (an investment group comprising Onex Corporation and other investors) completed its purchase of BAE Systems Canada. The company was then renamed CMC Electronics since it had previously sold its rights for the Marconi name to Marconi plc. In 2007, CMC Electronics was sold to Esterline Corporation. Transdigm bought Esterline in 2019.

Company structure 

CMC has three primary operating business units: Navigation Systems, Cockpit System Integration, Panels and Sensors.   It has an approximate 50/50 split between commercial and military sales.

See also

 Bombardier Aerospace
 COM DEV International
 Héroux-Devtek
 MacDonald, Dettwiler and Associates
 Spar Aerospace
 Viking Air

References 

Canadian subsidiaries of foreign companies
Aerospace companies of Canada
Electronics companies of Canada
Manufacturing companies established in 1903
1903 establishments in Quebec
Manufacturing companies based in Montreal
Guglielmo Marconi
Saint-Laurent, Quebec
2007 mergers and acquisitions